Douvilleiceratidae is a family of ammonites. These fast-moving nektonic carnivores lived in the Cretaceous from 125.45 to 94.3 Ma.

Its fossils have been found in Angola, Brazil, Canada, Colombia, the Dominican Republic, France, Germany, India, Iran, Italy, Japan, Madagascar, Mexico, Morocco, Peru, South Africa, Spain, Switzerland, Russia, the United Kingdom, United States and Venezuela.

Subfamilies and genera
 Cheloniceratinae Spath, 1923
 Cheloniceras Hyatt, 1903
 Procheloniceras Spath, 1923
 Douvilleiceratinae Parona and Bonarelli, 1987
 Douvilleiceras Grossouvre, 1894
 Roloboceratinae Casey, 1961
 Roloboceras

References

Ammonitida families
Ancyloceratina
Cretaceous ammonites